Events from the 1550s in England. This decade marks the beginning of the Elizabethan era.

Incumbents
 Monarch – Edward VI (until 6 July 1553), Jane (disputed, 6 July to 19 July 1553), Mary I (starting 19 July 1553, until 17 November 1558) and Philip (starting 25 July 1554, until 17 November 1558), then Elizabeth I 
 Regent – John Dudley, 1st Duke of Northumberland (starting 2 February 1550, until 19 July 1553)
 Parliament – 1st of King Edward VI (until 15 April 1552), 2nd of King Edward VI (starting 1 March, until 31 March 1553), 1st of Queen Mary I (starting 5 October, until 5 December 1553), 2nd of Queen Mary I (starting 2 April, until 3 May 1554), 3rd of Queen Mary I (starting 12 November 1554, until 16 January 1555), 4th of Queen Mary I (starting 21 October, until 9 December 1555), 5th of Queen Mary I (starting 20 January, until 17 November 1558), 1st of Queen Elizabeth I (starting 23 January, until 8 May 1559)

Events
 1550
 January – Parliament passes an Act encouraging iconoclasm.
 24 March – England and France sign the Treaty of Boulogne; England withdraws from Boulogne in France and returns territorial gains in Scotland.
 29 March – Sherborne School in Dorset is refounded by King Edward VI.
 24 July – French Protestant Church of London established by Royal Charter.
 1551
 By July – Fifth and last outbreak of sweating sickness in England. John Caius of Shrewsbury writes the first full contemporary account of the symptoms of the disease.
 11 October – John Dudley, Earl of Warwick, de facto Lord Protector of England, is created Duke of Northumberland.
 St Thomas' Hospital re-established on its former site in Southwark by the Corporation of London, taken as the founding date for St Thomas's Hospital Medical School.
 Parliament passes the Ale Houses Act licensing taverns for the first time.
 Silver sixpence and crown first minted.
 1552
 January – Act of Uniformity imposes the Second Book of Common Prayer (with effect from March). Parish priests are to give instruction in the catechism every Sunday afternoon.
 22 January – execution of the former Lord Protector Edward Seymour, 1st Duke of Somerset for treason.
 24 February – the privileges of the Hanseatic League are abolished in England.
 24 September – the Debatable Lands on the border of England and Scotland are divided between the two kingdoms by a commission creating the Scots' Dike in an unsuccessful attempt to halt lawlessness here, but giving both countries their modern borders.
 King Edward VI founds 35 grammar schools, including Shrewsbury; Leeds Grammar School is also established.
 1553 
 16 June – King Edward founds Christ's Hospital for London orphans.
 21 June – King Edward nominates Lady Jane Grey as his successor.
 6 July – King Edward VI dies of tuberculosis.
 10 July – Lady Jane Grey is proclaimed Queen of England.
 19 July – Thomas White Lord Mayor of London proclaims Queen Mary as the rightful Queen – Lady Jane Grey is imprisoned after using the title of queen for nine days.
 9 August – Mary arrives in London from Framlingham.
 22 August – Duke of Northumberland, a supporter of Lady Jane Grey, executed.
 August – Richard Chancellor enters the White Sea and reaches Archangel, going on to the court of Ivan IV of Russia, opening up trade between England and Russia.
 September – Protestant bishops in England are arrested and Roman Catholic bishops are restored.
 Approximate date – Ralph Roister Doister, the first known comedy in the English language, is written by London schoolmaster Nicholas Udall for his pupils to perform. Gammer Gurton's Needle by "Mr. S." follows.
 1554
 25 January – Wyatt's rebellion: Sir Thomas Wyatt leads a rebellion against Queen Mary's proposed marriage to Prince Philip of Spain.<ref
name="Cassell's Chronology"/>
 9 February – Wyatt's rebellion collapses and he surrenders in London.
 12 February – after claiming the throne of England the previous year, Lady Jane Grey is beheaded for treason alongside her husband.
 17 March – Princess Elizabeth imprisoned in the Tower of London, suspected of involvement in Wyatt's rebellion.
 21 May – a Royal Charter is granted to Derby School.
 25 July – wedding of Queen Mary and Prince Philip of Spain, only son of Charles V, Holy Roman Emperor, at Winchester Cathedral under the terms of the Act for the Marriage of Queen Mary to Philip of Spain.
 November – English captain John Lok voyages to Guinea.
 30 November – England formally rejoins the Roman Catholic Church.
 c. December – Revival of the Heresy Acts: Parliament revives laws against heresy.
 Foundation of Queen Mary's Grammar School, Walsall, and The Free Grammar School of King Philip and Queen Mary, Clitheroe.
 1555
 4 February – John Rogers suffers death by burning at the stake at Smithfield, London, the first of the Protestant martyrs of the English Reformation under Mary I.
 8 February – Laurence Saunders is the second of the Marian Protestant martyrs, being led barefoot to his death by burning at the stake in Coventry.
 9 February – Rowland Taylor, Rector of Hadleigh, Suffolk, and John Hooper, deposed Bishop of Gloucester, are burned at the stake.
 1 May – foundation of St John's College, Oxford.
 30 May – foundation of Trinity College, Oxford.
 12 July – the first four Canterbury Martyrs are burned at the stake.
 16 October – two of the Oxford Martyrs, Hugh Latimer and Nicholas Ridley, are burned at the stake.
 English captain John Lok returns from Guinea with 5 Africans to train as interpreters for future trading voyages.
 The Muscovy Company is chartered to trade with the Tsardom of Russia and Richard Chancellor negotiates with the Tsar.
 Establishment of the following grammar schools: Boston Grammar School, Gresham's School at Holt, Norfolk (founded by Sir John Gresham) and Ripon Grammar School (re-foundation).
 Richard Eden translates The Decades of the Newe Worlde or West India, urging his countrymen to follow the lead of Spain in exploring the New World.
 1556
 January – Soldier Sir Henry Dudley, from France, plots to raise an invasion force which is planned to land on the Isle of Wight, march on London, remove Queen Mary to exile in Spain and place the Protestant Elizabeth on the throne. By July, the plot is discovered and abandoned.
 21 March – the third of the Oxford Martyrs, Thomas Cranmer, deposed Archbishop of Canterbury, is burned at the stake for treason.
 22 March – Reginald Pole enthroned as Archbishop of Canterbury.
 27 June – thirteen Protestant Stratford Martyrs are burned at the stake in London.
 Establishment of Laxton Grammar School.
 Period of rapid inflation; prices of many basic commodities double in 12 months.
 1557
 28 February – a commercial treaty is signed with Russia.
 May – Benedictine monks allowed to return to Westminster Abbey.
 5 June – publication in London of Tottel's Miscellany (Songes and Sonettes), the first printed anthology of English poetry.
 7 June – Italian War of 1551–59: England, now allied with Spain, declares war on France.
 Summer – 1557 influenza pandemic reaches the British Isles.
 10 August – Italian War: English and Spanish victory over the French at the Battle of St. Quentin. First record of a Royal Artillery Band.
 Gonville and Caius College, Cambridge, is refounded by John Caius.
 The following schools are founded: Brentwood School, Essex, by Sir Antony Browne; Hampton School, Hampton, London, by Robert Hammond; and Repton School, Derbyshire, by Sir John Port.
 Robert Recorde's The Whetstone of Witte is published, the first English book on algebra, containing the first recorded use of the equals sign and also the first use in English of plus and minus signs.
 Thomas Tusser's instructional poem A Hundreth Good Pointes of Husbandrie is published.
 1558
 7 January – French troops led by Francis, Duke of Guise take Calais, the last continental possession of England.
 By September – second wave of 1557 influenza pandemic in England.
 15 November – the last five Protestant martyrs of the English Reformation are burnt, at Canterbury.
 17 November – Elizabethan era begins: Queen Mary I dies at St James's Palace and is succeeded by her Protestant half–sister Elizabeth (at this time resident at Hatfield House), who will rule for 44 years. 12 hours later, Mary's Archbishop of Canterbury, Cardinal Reginald Pole, dies in London.
 20 November – William Cecil appointed principal Secretary of State.
 1559
 15 January – Elizabeth I of England is crowned in Westminster Abbey by Owen Oglethorpe, Bishop of Carlisle.
 23 January – Elizabethan Religious Settlement: Parliament passes the Act of Uniformity and the Act of Supremacy, re-establishing the Protestant Church of England.
 10 February – House of Commons makes a 'Loyal Address', urging Queen Elizabeth to marry.
 2 April – Peace of Cateau Cambrésis: France makes peace with England and Spain. France gives up most of its gains in Italy (including Savoy), keeping only Saluzzo, but keeps the three Lorraine bishoprics of Metz, Toul, and Verdun, and the formerly English town of Calais.
 19 December – Matthew Parker enthroned as Archbishop of Canterbury.
 Reintroduction of the Book of Common Prayer.
 Benedictine monks once again expelled from Westminster Abbey.
 The predecessor of the private banking house of Child & Co. (which will still exist in the 21st century) is established in London.

Births
 1550
 April 12 – Edward de Vere, 17th Earl of Oxford, Lord Great Chamberlain (died 1604)
 October 25 – Ralph Sherwin, Roman Catholic priest and saint (martyred 1581)
 Approximate date
 Henry Barrowe, Puritan and Separatist (died 1593)
 Philip Henslowe, theatrical entrepreneur (died 1616)
 Judith Ivye, wife of Anthony Prater (died 1578)
 Edward Somerset, 4th Earl of Worcester (died 1628)
 1551
 2 May – William Camden, historian (died 1623)
 George Tuchet, 1st Earl of Castlehaven (died 1617)
 1552
 22 January (or 1554?) – Walter Raleigh, soldier, politician, courtier, explorer, historian, poet and spy (executed 1618)
 1 February – Edward Coke, colonial entrepreneur and jurist (died 1634)
 30 December – Simon Forman, occultist and astrologer (died 1611)
 Thomas Aufield, Catholic martyr (died 1585)
 Philemon Holland, translator (died 1637)
 Edmund Spenser, poet (died 1599)
 1553
 John Croke, judge and Speaker of the House of Commons (died 1620)
 John Florio, writer and translator (died 1625)
 Richard Hakluyt, author, editor and translator (died 1616)
 Approximate date
 Henry Robinson, Bishop of Carlisle (died 1616)
 William Russell, 1st Baron Russell of Thornhaugh, military leader (died 1613)
 Jack Ward, pirate (died 1622)
 1554
 March – Richard Hooker, Anglican theologian (died 1600)
 April – Stephen Gosson, satirist (died 1624)
 3 October – Fulke Greville, 1st Baron Brooke, poet (died 1628)
 30 November – Philip Sidney, courtier and poet (died 1586)
 James Lancaster, navigator (died 1618)
 John Lyly, writer (died 1606)
 John Smyth, Baptist minister (died 1612)
 Francis Throckmorton, conspirator (died 1584)
 1555
 1 August – Edward Kelley, spirit medium (died 1597)
 Lancelot Andrewes, clergyman and scholar (died 1626)
 17 July – Richard Carew, Cornish translator and antiquary (died 1620)
 Henry Garnet, Jesuit (executed 1606)
 1556
 February – Henry Briggs, mathematician (died 1630)
 6 June – Edward la Zouche, 11th Baron Zouche, politician and diplomat (died 1625)
 Margaret Clitherow, Catholic martyr (died 1586)
 1557
Julius Caesar, judge and politician (died 1636)
 Thomas Morley, English composer (died 1602)
 1558
 3 November – Thomas Kyd, author of The Spanish Tragedy (died 1594)
 Robert Greene, writer (died 1592)
 Chidiock Tichborne, conspirator and poet (died 1586)
 1559
 c. 23 April – William Watson, Catholic priest and conspirator (executed 1603)
George Chapman, dramatist (died 1634)
John Overall, bishop and academic (died 1619)
John Spenser, president of Corpus Christi College, Oxford (died 1614)

Deaths
 1550
 30 July – Thomas Wriothesley, 1st Earl of Southampton, politician (born 1505)
 1551
 13 July – John Wallop, soldier and diplomat (born 1490)
 14 July
 Henry Brandon, 2nd Duke of Suffolk, heir to the Dukedom of Suffolk of the second creation (sweating sickness) (born 1535)
 Charles Brandon, 3rd Duke of Suffolk, heir to the Dukedom of Suffolk of the second creation (sweating sickness) (born 1537/8)
 1552
 22 January – Edward Seymour, 1st Duke of Somerset, politician (born 1509)
 18 April – John Leland, antiquary and historian (born 1502)
 10 June – Alexander Barclay, poet (born 1476)
 October – Simon Haynes, Vice-Chancellor of the University of Cambridge, ambassador and Dean of Exeter
 1553
 6 July – King Edward VI (born 1537)
 22 August – John Dudley, 1st Duke of Northumberland, politician (executed) (born 1504)
 1554
 12 February
Lady Jane Grey, claimant to the throne of England (executed) (born 1537)
Guilford Dudley, consort of Lady Jane Grey (executed) (born c. 1535)
 23 February – Henry Grey, 1st Duke of Suffolk, politician (executed) (born 1517)
 11 April – Thomas Wyatt the Younger, rebel (executed) (born 1521)
 4 August – Sir James Hales, judge (suicide by drowning) (born c. 1550)
 25 August – Thomas Howard, 3rd Duke of Norfolk, politician (born 1473)
 December – John Taylor, Bishop of Lincoln (born 1503)
 Sir Hugh Willoughby, explorer (in the Arctic Sea)
 1555
 4 February – John Rogers, clergyman and Bible translator (burned at the stake) (born c. 1500)
 8 February – Laurence Saunders, clergyman (burned at the stake) (born 1500s)
 9 February
John Hooper, deposed bishop (burned at the stake) (born c. 1497)
Rowland Taylor, clergyman (burned at the stake) (born 1510)
 14 March  – John Russell, 1st Earl of Bedford (born 1485)
 18 April – Polydore Vergil, historian (born 1470)
 25 August – Thomas Howard, 3rd Duke of Norfolk (born 1473)
 5 October – Edward Wotton, zoologist (born 1492)
 16 October
Hugh Latimer, clergyman (burned at the stake) (born c. 1487)
 Nicholas Ridley, clergyman (burned at the stake) (born c. 1500)
 12 November – Stephen Gardiner, bishop and Lord Chancellor (born 1493)
 1556
 21 March – Thomas Cranmer, Archbishop of Canterbury (burned at the stake) (born 1489)
 11 August – John Bell, Bishop of Worcester
 10 November – Richard Chancellor, Arctic explorer (born c. 1521)
 23 December – Nicholas Udall, dramatist (born 1504)
 1557
 28 May – Thomas Stafford aristocrat and rebel (executed) (born c. 1533)
 16 July – Anne of Cleves, queen of Henry VIII of England (born 1515)
 13 September – John Cheke, classical scholar and statesman (born 1514)
 25 October – William Cavendish, courtier (born 1505)
 18 December – Joyce Lewis, gentlewoman, Protestant convert and martyr (burned at the stake)
 1558
 31 May – Philip Hoby, politician (born 1505)
 17 November
 Queen Mary I of England (born 1516)
 Reginald Pole, Cardinal Archbishop of Canterbury (born 1500)
 (bur.) Hugh Aston, composer (born 1485)
 15 December – Thomas Cheney, Lord Warden of the Cinque Ports (born c. 1485)
 1559
 8 March – Thomas Tresham I, Catholic politician
 16 March – Anthony St. Leger, Lord Deputy of Ireland (born 1496)
 10 September – Anthony Denny, confidant of Henry VIII of England (born 1501)
 18 November – Cuthbert Tunstall, Prince-Bishop of Durham (born 1474)
 20 November – Lady Frances Brandon, claimant to the throne of England (born 1517)
 31 December – Owen Oglethorpe, deposed Bishop of Carlisle
 Approximate date – Leonard Digges, mathematician and surveyor (born c. 1515)

References